"Foxy's Hole" is a nursery rhyme for children that is played as a game. It is thought to originate from the Tudor period. The lyrics are as follows:

Put your finger in Foxy's hole
Foxy's not at home
Foxy's out at the back door
Picking at a bone

The game involves the adult catching the child's finger in a clenched fist, which represents Foxy's "hole".

References 

English nursery rhymes
English folk songs
English children's songs
Traditional children's songs
Year of song unknown
Songwriter unknown